In mathematics, Dieudonné's theorem, named after Jean Dieudonné, is a theorem on when the Minkowski sum of closed sets is closed.

Statement 
Let  be a locally convex space and  nonempty closed convex sets.

References 

Convex analysis
Theorems in functional analysis